This is a list of properties and districts in Candler County, Georgia that are listed on the National Register of Historic Places (NRHP).

Current listings

|}

References

Candler
Buildings and structures in Candler County, Georgia